Hopewell is an unincorporated community in Pittsylvania County, Virginia, United States. It lies at an elevation of 853 feet (260 m).

References

Unincorporated communities in Pittsylvania County, Virginia
Unincorporated communities in Virginia